La República perdida is the name of a series of Argentine documentary films about the history of Argentina. It is focused on the Coups d'état in Argentina, and uses photos and video tapes, while Aldo Barbero narrates it. It was directed by Miguel Pérez.

The first documentary film was edited in 1983, after the end of the National Reorganization Process (the last coups d'état in Argentina) and the return of democratic rule. The second one, La república perdida II, was edited in 1986.

External links
 Entry at CineNacional.com

Documentary television films
Argentine documentary films
Dirty War films
1980s Argentine films